Piruzabad may refer to:
 Piruzabad, Golestan
 Piruzabad, Hamadan
 Piruzabad, Kerman
 Piruzabad, Khuzestan
 Piruzabad, Yazd

See also
 Firuzabad (disambiguation)